Operation Rübezahl was the name of 3 German anti-partisan operations in Yugoslavia during World War II. The first operation announced the beginning of a strategic retreat by Nazi German troops from Serbia after the front change of Romania and Bulgaria.

Operation Rübezahl I 
In summer 1944, German soldiers were doing sweeps against communist-led Yugoslav Partisans under the overall command of Josip Broz Tito. But on 30 August, after Romania and Bulgaria split from their Nazi ally, Germany entered into a crisis on the Balkan front. While the forces of the Partisans were moving to unite with the Soviet Red Army in the German-occupied territory of Serbia, German troops tried to avoid defeat in that strategic area by implementing "Operation Rübezahl" to enable the organised retreat of Germans. Among them there were:

 1st Mountain Division
 7th SS Volunteer Mountain Division Prinz Eugen
 13th Waffen Mountain Division of the SS Handschar (1st Croatian)
 21st Waffen Mountain Division of the SS Skanderbeg (1st Albanian)

Between 20 and 22 August, German troops surrounded and destroyed a particularly large Partisan unit moving westwards from the Independent State of Croatia to occupied Serbia. Only a few Partisans survived thanks to Allied planes which managed to land on battered airstrips, air-lifting about a thousand injured to hospitals located in Italy.

Operation Rübezahl II 
Operation Rübezahl II was a German offensive in February 1945 against Yugoslav partisans in the Slovene Littoral.

Operation Rübezahl III 
Operation Rübezahl III was a German and Croat offensive in March 1945 against the Yugoslav 30th 'Slovenia' Division, who was threatening the important port city of Trieste.

References

Bibliography 
 
 
 
 
 

Yugoslav Resistance